Kuapnit Balinsasayao National Park is a protected area of the Philippines located in the municipalities of Abuyog and Baybay on Leyte island of Eastern Visayas. It was declared a national park in 1937 by virtue of Proclamation No. 142.

Topography and ecology 
Kuapnit Balinsasayao National Park lies at the southern fringe of the Anonang-Lobi Range that runs north to south through western Leyte. This mountain range consists of the highest peaks in Leyte Island including Mount Burauen Graben, Mount Camaiyak and Mount Lobi, the highest at 1,346 m. Mount Maganjan at 754 m. is the most prominent peak nearest to the park.

The park is covered in most parts by old-growth forest. It is home to three bird species endemic to the Eastern Visayas region, the Samar hornbill, Visayan broadbill, and yellow-breasted tailorbird. The Philippine deer, Philippine warty pig and tarsier are also found here.

References

See also
List of national parks of the Philippines

National parks of the Philippines
Forests of the Philippines
Protected areas established in 1937
1937 establishments in the Philippines
Landforms of Leyte (province)
Tourist attractions in Leyte (province)